An independence referendum was held in New Caledonia on 13 September 1987. Voters were given the choice of remaining part of France or becoming independent. The referendum was boycotted by independence movements. Only 1.7% voted in favour of independence.

Background
By a vote of 325 to 249, the French Parliament passed a law on 15 April 1984 on holding an independence referendum in New Caledonia. Independence movements including the Kanak and Socialist National Liberation Front boycotted the referendum in protest at the franchise requirements, which made the indigenous population a minority. Although former French president François Mitterrand had promised short-term residents of the territory would not be able to vote, they were enfranchised for the referendum. As a result of claimed failures to respect the rights of the indigenous population, the United Nations Special Committee on Decolonization did not send observers.

Results

See also
 2018 New Caledonian independence referendum
 2020 New Caledonian independence referendum
 2021 New Caledonian independence referendum
 Decolonisation of Oceania
 United Nations list of non-self-governing territories
 Ouvéa cave hostage taking (1988)
 "Yaka dansé"

References

1987 in New Caledonia
New Caledonia
1987
New Caledonia
Separatism in France
Separatism in Oceania
Decolonization
September 1987 events in Oceania